Scandalous Eva is a 1930 German comedy film directed by G. W. Pabst and starring Henny Porten, Oskar Sima, and Ludwig Stössel.  The film's sets were designed by the art director Franz Schroedter.

Cast
 Henny Porten as Dr. Eva Rüttgers
 Oskar Sima as Dr. Kurt Hiller
 Ludwig Stössel as Dir. Rohrbach
 Paul Henckels as Prof. Hagen
 Adele Sandrock as Vulpius
 Käthe Haack as Käte Brandt
 Fritz Odemar as Lämmerberg
 Claus Clausen as Schlotterbeck
 Frigga Braut as Frau Schlotterbeck
 Karl Etlinger as Steinlechner

References

Bibliography

External links

1930 films
1930s German-language films
1930 comedy films
German comedy films
German black-and-white films
Films directed by G. W. Pabst
Films of the Weimar Republic
Films produced by Seymour Nebenzal
1930s German films